Lee Arthur Horsley (born May 15, 1955) is an American film, television, and theater actor known for starring roles in the television series Nero Wolfe (1981), Matt Houston (1982–1985), and Paradise (1988–1991).  He starred in the 1982 film The Sword and the Sorcerer and recorded the audiobook edition of Lonesome Dove.

Career 
Horsley began his acting career touring in stage productions of West Side Story, Damn Yankees, and Oklahoma!. In 1981, he portrayed TV detective Archie Goodwin in the short-lived NBC drama series Nero Wolfe. He played the title character in the 1982–1985 ABC detective series Matt Houston, and starred as Ethan Allen Cord in the 1988–1991 Western Heritage Award-winning series Paradise. This was followed by a lead role on the CBS police drama Bodies of Evidence (1992–1993).

He appeared in the feature-length cult film The Sword and the Sorcerer in 1982, and appeared in its sequel Tales of an Ancient Empire in 2010. He recorded the audiobook edition of Larry McMurtry's Lonesome Dove. In 2006, Horsley and Marshall R. Teague traveled the world in search of exotic game on the Outdoor Life Network for the reality show, Benelli's Dream Hunts. In 2012, Horsley appeared in the Quentin Tarantino film Django Unchained as Sheriff Gus, and in Tarantino's 2015 western The Hateful Eight as a stagecoach driver. He also starred opposite Lynda Carter in a series set in the French and Indian War era, Hawkeye.

Personal life
Horsley was born in Muleshoe, Texas, the seat of Bailey County. He grew up in the Denver, Colorado area, sang in a church choir and graduated from Englewood High School in 1973. Horsley married Stephanie Downer in 1980 and fathered a daughter, Amber, in 1981 and a son, Logan, in 1983. Horsley is an outdoorsman, horseman, rodeo participant, and western novelist.

Filmography

Television

References

External links
 

1955 births
Male actors from Texas
American male film actors
American male television actors
Living people
People from Muleshoe, Texas